Church of Saint Maurice is a Roman Catholic church in Olomouc, Czech Republic. It is located in the city centre, near the Horní náměstí ("Upper Square") and remains one of the most important landmarks of the city.

It is unknown when exactly the church was constructed. It has two towers – the southern tower dates back to 1403, which is the oldest part of the building; the northern one dates back to 1412. The church was probably consecrated in 1492. The Neo-Gothic main altar was built in 1861. The church is built as arched triple-nave. Main nave contains church organs, which originates from 1740–45; with their five manuals and 135 registers they are the 7th largest in Central Europe (and 52nd in the world). Their author was organist Michael Engler.

The church was designated a National Cultural Landmark by the government in 1995. The southern tower serves as a lookout tower with view on the whole city of Olomouc and surroundings.

References

External links 

 Official website of the parish 

Churches in Olomouc
Roman Catholic churches in the Czech Republic
National Cultural Monuments of the Czech Republic